Nutrition and Health is a quarterly peer-reviewed medical journal that covers the field of nutrition. The editor-in-chief is Michael Crawford (Imperial College London). It was established in 1982 and is currently published by SAGE Publications.

Abstracting and indexing 
Nutrition and Health is abstracted and indexed in:
 Agroforestry Abstracts
 ArticleFirst
 Biological Abstracts
 Food Science and Technology Abstracts
 Physical Education Index

External links 
 

SAGE Publishing academic journals
English-language journals
Nutrition and dietetics journals
Publications established in 1982
Quarterly journals